Walter Leonard Cole (15 May 1866 – 26 April 1943) was an Irish merchant and politician in the early twentieth century. Prior to the foundation of the Irish Free State, he was an alderman for a period. An active republican, he was a founding director of the Sinn Féin Printing & Publishing Company. He also led the Sinn Féin grouping in Dublin Corporation in the early 1900s.

Personal life
Cole was born in Liverpool on 15 May 1866 to an Irish father, George Cole, a railway accountant, and an English mother, Arabella Hughes. He was educated at the St Francis Xavier's College, Liverpool and the University of London. He married Anna Harrison in 1894, who had been born in the USA. The couple moved to Dublin and had three sons. Harrison died in 1921, and Cole married Mary Redden in 1928, with whom he had two daughters.

Politics
As a well-off supporter of the underground Irish republican movement in the early twentieth century, his house on Mountjoy Square seems to have been a regular meeting place for senior figures within that movement.  The notes of Seamus Reader, an Irish Volunteer from Glasgow, record a meeting on 2 January 1916 at Cole's house:
All of whom were signatories to the Proclamation of the Irish Republic and all of whom were executed the following May, as leaders of the Easter Rising.

Cole is also documented as having hosted provisional Dáil meetings at his home, the assembly having been driven underground in September 1919. He was arrested by the military at his home at No. 3 Mountjoy Square in 1920.

After the Anglo-Irish Treaty and the foundation of the Irish Free State, he was elected a pro-Treaty Sinn Féin Teachta Dála (TD) to the 3rd Dáil Éireann for Cavan constituency at the 1922 general election. The "Pro-Treaty" prefix relates to his position in the Irish Civil War. He and Seán Milroy stood alongside Arthur Griffith with one other opponent, Patrick Baxter of the Farmers' Party and three seats available. Cole stood again in Cavan as a Cumann na nGaedheal candidate at the following 1923 general election but was not elected.

Cole unsuccessfully ran for election to Seanad Éireann in 1925.  He was later a commissioner for Mountjoy Square.

References

External links
UCD Archives collection of Cole's papers

1866 births
1943 deaths
Early Sinn Féin TDs
Cumann na nGaedheal politicians
Members of the 3rd Dáil
People of the Irish Civil War (Pro-Treaty side)